Walter Mills may refer to:

 Walter Mills (VC) (1894–1917), English recipient of the Victoria Cross
 Walter Mills (cricketer) (1852–1902), English cricketer
 Walter Edward Mills (1850–1910), English architect
 Walter Thomas Mills (1856–1942), American socialist activist, educator and newspaper publisher